The Women's 1500 metres at the 2014 IPC Athletics European Championships was held at the Swansea University Stadium from 18–23 August. Only final events were contested; no heats events were taken part.

Medalists

Results

T12
Final

T20
Final

T54
Final

See also
List of IPC world records in athletics

References

1500 metres
2014 in women's athletics
1500 metres at the World Para Athletics European Championships